The 2021–22 Wycombe Wanderers Football Club season is the club's 135th season in existence. They will be playing in League One, the third tier of English football, having been relegated from the 2020–21 EFL Championship. In addition to the domestic league, Wycombe will be participating in this season's editions of the FA Cup, the EFL Cup, the EFL Trophy and the Berks and Bucks Senior Cup

Players

Current squad

 Loan player

Transfers

Transfers in

Loans in

Transfers out

Loans out

Pre-season and friendlies
Wycombe Wanderers' first four pre-season friendly fixtures were announced on 28 May 2021, which consisted of a main squad fixture against Stevenage at a neutral venue on 17 July 2021 as well as three fixtures for the development team against Chesham United on 9 July 2021, Aylesbury United on 23 July 2021 and Hanwell Town on 30 July 2021. A fifth friendly was confirmed for July 28, as Leicester City to visit Adams Park.

Competitions

Overview

EFL League One

League table

Results summary

Results by matchday

Matches
Wycombe's fixtures were announced on 24 June 2021. Due to Derby County's financial irregularities from previous seasons, an interchangeable fixture list was originally made between Derby County in the Championship and Wycombe Wanderers in League One in case of any retrospective points deductions to be awarded for the 2020–21 season. However, on 2 July 2021, it was confirmed that Wycombe Wanderers would remain in League One after the EFL decided not to appeal against the Independent Disciplinary Commission's ruling of a £100,000 fine against Derby County.

League One play-offs

FA Cup

Wycombe Wanderers were drawn away to Hartlepool United in the first round.

EFL Cup

Wanderers were drawn away to Exeter City in the first round, Stevenage in the second round and Manchester City in the third round.

EFL Trophy

Wycombe were drawn into Southern Group C alongside Aston Villa U21s, Burton Albion and Milton Keynes Dons. On July 7, the dates were confirmed for the group stage ties.

Berks & Bucks FA Senior Cup 

As one of three EFL clubs competing in the Berks & Bucks FA Senior Cup, alongside Milton Keynes Dons and Reading, Wycombe will enter the competition in the quarter-finals as they did back in the 2019–20 competition, which was cancelled due to the COVID-19 pandemic. Wycombe Wanderers were drawn against Spartan South Midlands League Division One side Long Crendon. Wycombe beat Long Crendon 4–0 in what was the ASM Stadium record attendance in the stadium's existence (Beating Thame United vs Oxford United in 2011, 1,382). Wycombe drew against the Combined Counties League Premier Division North side Ascot United to set up a potential final against either Berkshire side Reading or fellow Buckinghamshire side MK Dons. Wycombe Lost 3–1 to Ascot United on penalties in what is another record breaking attendance for Ascot United with 1,267 people entering in the ground

Statistics

Appearances and goals

|-
|colspan="12"|Players who left the club before the end of the season:

|}

References

External links

Wycombe Wanderers F.C. seasons
Wycombe Wanderers F.C.